Campbell Singer (born Jacob Kobel Singer; 16 March 1909 – 16 February 1976) was a British character actor who featured in a number of stage, film and television roles during his long career. He was also a playwright and dramatist.

Life
He was born in London in 1909

Singer was a regular in British post-war comedy films, often playing policemen. He first appeared on television in 1946, making regular appearances in the following three decades including several episodes of 'Hancock's Half Hour', and played the lead, John Unthank, in the BBC drama series 'Private Investigator' in 1958/59.

From the early 1960s he appeared more consistently on television. He played several roles in the 1966 Doctor Who story The Celestial Toymaker, and made two appearances in different roles in the popular television series Dad's Army, including as corrupt politician Sir Charles McAllister. He also featured as Mr Finney in a Some Mothers Do 'Ave 'Em Christmas Special, and played a lodger in an episode of On the Buses.

As a writer, Singer co-authored several plays with George Ross, including Guilty Party, Difference of Opinion and Any Other Business, some of which were also televised.

Filmography

References

External links

1909 births
1976 deaths
English male television actors
English male film actors
English male stage actors
20th-century English male actors
English male dramatists and playwrights
20th-century English male writers